Anna Yevgenyevna Medvedeva (born 30 July 1989) is a Russian cross-country skier who competes internationally with the Russian national team.

She competed at the FIS Nordic World Ski Championships 2017 in Lahti, Finland.

Cross-country skiing results
All results are sourced from the International Ski Federation (FIS).

World Championships

World Cup

Season standings

References

External links 

1989 births
Living people
Russian female cross-country skiers